Path of the Warrior may refer to

Shambhala: The Sacred Path of the Warrior, a book concerning the Shambhala Buddhist vision of Chögyam Trungpa
Art of Fighting 3: The Path of the Warrior, a 1996 video game in the Art of Fighting series

See also
Warriors' Path State Park
Warriors Path State Park
Susquehanna Warrior Trail
Great Indian Warpath
Way of the Warrior (disambiguation)